James R. M. Harris (born 12 February 1961) is a Canadian author, environmentalist, and politician. He was leader of the Green Party of Canada from 2003 to 2006, when he was succeeded by Elizabeth May.

Early life and Green activism
Harris was born in Toronto, attended Lakefield College School, and received a Bachelor of Arts degree in English and History from Queen's University in Kingston in the 1980s. Initially a Progressive Conservative, he was converted to green politics in 1985 after reading Green Politics by Fritjof Capra and Charlene Spretnak, which highlights the rise of the German Greens. Harris worked as the national press officer of the British Green Party in 1987.

He helped organize the Ontario Green Party's campaign in the 1990 provincial election, and was himself a candidate in the Toronto division of St. Andrew—St. Patrick. In this election, he spoke against a provincial government decision to build more nuclear reactors in the province. The Green Party fielded 40 candidates and received 33,000 votes, a significant increase from seven candidates and 3,000 votes in the previous 1987 election. Harris finished fourth in his constituency.

Harris campaigned for Mayor of Toronto in the 1991 municipal election, as an independent candidate supporting green policies. He called for water conservation and a ban on city pesticide spraying, and supported stricter gun control. Considered a fringe candidate, he finished well behind frontrunners June Rowlands and Jack Layton.

In 1993, Harris and other Ontario Greens sought and won a change in the party's constitution allowing for the election of a full-time leader. The party had been nominally led by Katherine Mathewson in the 1990 election, but she held little influence over the campaign or policy. Harris and others argued that electing a full-time leader would allow the Green Party to organize professionally, and present a united message in future elections. Harris stood for the leadership, and lost to Frank de Jong. De Jong later supported Harris in his bid to become federal leader, while Harris endorsed de Jong's bid for re-election as provincial leader in 2001.

Harris was a Toronto organizer for the federal Green Party for the 1993 election, recruiting seventeen candidates in the area. New legislation brought in before the election required a party to run 50 candidate or suffer de-registration and lose its assets. By fielding seventeen candidates in the Toronto region (which then had roughly twenty-two ridings) the Toronto team presented over one-third of the national requirement. Harris stood for election in St. Paul's, and finished sixth.

Harris campaigned for leader of the Green Party of Canada in 1997, and finished second against Joan Russow. He was elected as the first president of the Green Party of Ontario in 2001, and served in that capacity until moving to the federal arena in 2003.

Author and speaker
Harris has written six books, two of which have been national best-sellers in Canada. He also delivers speeches on change and leadership in the corporate sector, and was forced to miss at least one campaign appearance in 2004 to fulfill a prior speaking engagement. Association Magazine has ranked him as one of Canada's top speakers. He spoke at about fifty international conferences a year before becoming GPC leader, and conducts strategic planning sessions with executive teams on leadership, change, CRM, eLearning, innovation and creating learning organizations.

His second book, The Learning Paradox, was nominated for the National Business Book Award in Canada and appeared on several bestseller lists. In this work, Harris argues that Canadians should embrace new learning to gain usable skills for a business community grounded in rapid technological change. Books for Business ranked it as one of the top-10 business books in North America. Harris co-authored the second edition of The 100 Best Companies to Work for in Canada, which sold over 50,000 copies in Canada. A more recent book, Blindsided!, has been published in over 80 countries.

National leader

2004 campaign
Harris was elected leader of the Green Party of Canada on 14 February 2003, defeating Jason Crummey and John Grogan with over 81% of the votes cast by delegates. He replaced interim leader Chris Bradshaw, who led the party from 2001 to 2003. In his campaign for the leadership, Harris asked the membership to elect his preferred slate of council candidates. Other than leadership contestants, council candidates were not given the membership list to use in their campaign despite the green party constitution clearly offering them that right.

Harris attempted to shift the GPC away from an exclusively environmentalist message, and often described the party's ideology as socially progressive and fiscally conservative and as the only party committed to sustainability. He has rejected the argument that voting for the Greens will elect Conservative candidates through vote-splitting, arguing that his party takes support from across the traditional political spectrum.

The party conducted a high-profile campaign in the 2004 election under Harris's leadership, running candidates in all federal ridings for the first time in its history. The 2004 GPC platform, produced by wiki technology called LivingPlatform. As such the GPC was the first party worldwide to use a wiki—and an open process—to develop its platform. More than 60,000 people participated in the final selection of platform planks.

The Living Platform emphasized full cost accounting, the "triple bottom line" (social, financial, environmental) and the green tax shift. The party's fiscal policy proposed taxing polluting activities and non-renewable resources more and incomes less on a revenue-neutral basis. The plan also proposed selective tax cuts on corporate income, which alienated some left-of-centre Greens.

Despite their increased profile, Greens were not invited to the leadership debates. Harris complained of a double standard, as the Bloc Québécois had been included despite not fielding candidates in all ridings. The CRTC defended the right of the broadcasters' consortium to decide on participants and refused to overturn the party's exclusion.

On the eve of the 2004 election, Harris argued that as the NDP won nine seats with 6.9% of the vote in 1993, if the Greens would elect MPs if they could match or surpass that threshold. The party received 582,247 votes (4.3%), but failed to elect any candidates. Harris campaigned in Toronto—Danforth and finished fourth against New Democratic Party leader Jack Layton with 2,575 votes (5.4%) – 400 votes behind the Conservative candidate.

Criticism and 2004 leadership challenge
Harris's leadership of the Green Party was controversial. He described himself as an ecological conservative and eco-capitalist, and attempted to shift the party to the right on some issues. Some party members criticized Harris in August 2004 for hiring David Scrymgeour, a former national director of the Progressive Conservative Party of Canada and aide to Jim Flaherty, as an advisor. His opponents also accused him of shifting too much authority to the party leadership, while reducing the power of local associations.

Following the 2004 election, Harris was challenged for the leadership by Tom Manley, a prominent party activist from eastern Ontario. Manley argued that Harris was shifting the GPC too far to the right, and was abandoning the party's traditional emphasis on local production in favour of greater accommodation with corporate interests. Harris won re-election as GPC leader in August 2004 on the first ballot count, though by a narrower margin than before. Manley was later appointed deputy leader, but left the GPC in 2005 to join the Liberals.

A number of prominent Greens tendered their resignations during Harris's tenure as leader, with many accusing him of mismanaging the party.

Late in 2005, columnist Murray Dobbin wrote two articles accusing Harris of betraying the Green Party's progressive principles and using authoritarian methods to consolidate power. The second article, published in December 2005, noted that four of the party's eleven officers either resigned in protest or were suspended in the previous year, while a number of key positions were allowed to remain vacant. Dobbin also asserted that Harris's opponents believe he was responsible for undermining the "Living Platform", ignoring fundraising and policy development, and reducing party democracy.

Harris's supporters accused Dobbin of conducting a partisan smear campaign and of ignoring Harris's environmental credentials. Bill Hulet also defended Harris's efforts to reform the party structure, describing the existing system as an "absolute nightmare" because of consensus policy requirements that give small minorities the right to override majority decisions. Harris has defended his record as party leader, noting that membership increased significantly during his tenure rising from approximately 700 members in the summer of 2003 to over 10,000 on the eve of the 2006 Leadership Convention.

2006 campaign
As in 2004, Harris unsuccessfully called for the Green Party to be included in the televised leadership debates for the 2006 election. Three days before the election, he predicted that his party would win one million votes. The Greens increased their total to 665,940 votes (4.5%), but again failed to elect any candidates. Harris was a candidate in Beaches—East York, and finished fourth against Liberal incumbent Maria Minna.

The GPC's internal divisions were exposed during the election when former assistant national organizer Matthew Pollesel, who left the Green Party following a contract dispute, accused Harris of mismanaging the party's finances. Pollesel charged that money had been spent without proper reporting, and called for Elections Canada to investigate possible wrongdoing. In addition, Dana Miller, a former party candidate who was not permitted to run in 2006, later called on Elections Canada to investigate Harris's expenses from the 2004 leadership contest. Harris described the accusation as "false, groundless and scurrilous", and the party threatened a libel lawsuit in each case, though no suits were actually filed. On 24 April 2006, Jim Harris announced that he would not stand for re-election as party leader at the Green Party of Canada's August 2006 National Convention. On 26 August 2006, he was succeeded as leader by long-time environmental activist and former Sierra Club of Canada Executive Director Elizabeth May.

Post-leadership
Harris has remained active in the Green Party, maintaining blogs on the websites of both the federal Green Party and the Ontario Green Party. He continues to actively campaign for Green candidates. His Twitter profile is currently promoting Bernie Sanders.

Electoral record

The above results are taken from the Toronto Star newspaper, 14 November 1991, E8.

The federal and provincial electoral information is taken from Elections Canada and Elections Ontario. Italicized expenditures from elections after 1997 refer to submitted totals, and are presented when the final reviewed totals are not available. Expenditures from 1997 refer to submitted totals.

References

External links
Jim Harris' business web site
Jim Harris' National Post column (June 2009–present)
Jim Harris' Column in Backbone Magazine (2003–present)
Jim Harris' political blog (2003–2008)
Green Party of Canada: Jim Harris
CTV bio
Green Party Blues Walrus Magazine

1961 births
Living people
Green Party of Canada candidates in the 1993 Canadian federal election
Green Party of Canada candidates in the 1997 Canadian federal election
Green Party of Canada candidates in the 2004 Canadian federal election
Green Party of Canada candidates in the 2006 Canadian federal election
Green Party of Canada leaders
Queen's University at Kingston alumni
Politicians from Toronto
Presidents of the Green Party of Ontario
Ontario municipal politicians